Lake Chauya or Chioa is a lake in the Ucayali Region of Peru. It lies several kilometres east of the flow of the Ucayali River.

See also
List of lakes in Peru

References
INEI, Compendio Estadistica 2007, page 26

Chauya
Chauya